The State Register of Heritage Places is maintained by the Heritage Council of Western Australia. , 223 places are heritage-listed in the Shire of Northampton, of which 30 are on the State Register of Heritage Places.

List
The Western Australian State Register of Heritage Places, lists the following 30 state registered places within the Shire of Northampton:

References

Northampton
 
Northampton